Anthony Nicholas George Duckworth-Chad  (born 1942), of Pynkney Hall, in Tattersett near King's Lynn,  Norfolk, England, is a landowner, City of London business man, and a senior county officer for Norfolk.

Education 
Duckworth-Chad was educated at West Downs School, Winchester, and Eton College.

Public life
He is a liveryman and past Prime Warden of the Worshipful Company of Fishmongers of the City of London, Chairman of the Governing Body of Gresham's School, Holt, Vice-President of the Anglers’ Conservation Association,  Trustee of the Country Land and Business Association Charitable Trust, and Trustee of the Rudhams Playing Fields Trust.
In 1992, Duckworth-Chad was appointed High Sheriff of Norfolk. He now serves as a Deputy Lieutenant of Norfolk.

In 1999, he was appointed an Officer of the Order of the British Empire (OBE) for services to the Country Landowners' Association and the Rural Community.

Family

He is the son of Anthony John Stanhope Duckworth, the son of George Herbert Duckworth and Margaret Leonora Evelyn Selina Herbert. Anthony Duckworth-Chad's grandfather, Sir George Duckworth (1868–1934), was a half-brother of the painter Vanessa Bell and the writer Virginia Woolf (the latter charged George and her other half-brother, Gerald, with molesting her as a child and teenager).  His great-grandmother, born Julia Prinsep Jackson, was a niece of Julia Margaret Cameron, the photographer, while his great-grandfather, Herbert Duckworth, was a barrister. After her husband's death, Duckworth-Chad's great-grandmother Julia married secondly the author Leslie Stephen. Duckworth-Chad's paternal grandmother, Lady Margaret Herbert, was a daughter of the 4th Earl of Carnarvon, making him a cousin of Auberon Waugh.

Duckworth-Chad's great-uncle Gerald Duckworth founded the London publishing firm of Duckworth & Co. Duckworth-Chad agreed to become the heir of his great-uncle's widow with the stipulation that he would add her maiden name, Chad, to his own.

In 1970, Duckworth-Chad married (Elizabeth) Sarah Wake-Walker, a granddaughter of the seventh Earl Spencer. They have three children, James Anthony de L'Etang Duckworth-Chad (born 1972), William George Christopher (1975) and Davina Alice (1978).

Duckworth-Chad's wife, Elizabeth Wake-Walker, is a first cousin of Diana, Princess of Wales, and he is also reported to be a close friend of Charles, Prince of Wales. His son James was equerry to the Queen from 2001 to 2004, and his daughter Davina is a friend of her second cousins the Duke of Cambridge and the Duke of Sussex, both of whom attended her marriage to Tom Barber at Pynkney Hall on 25 September 2004.

See also
 Worshipful Company of Fishmongers
 Gresham's School

References

External links
 Anthony Duckworth-Chad at ThePeerage.com

1942 births
Deputy Lieutenants of Norfolk
High Sheriffs of Norfolk
Living people
People educated at West Downs School
People educated at Eton College
Officers of the Order of the British Empire
People from King's Lynn and West Norfolk (district)